The 2020 NCAA Division I Women's Swimming and Diving Championships was a planned competitive swim and dive meet to determine the women's National Collegiate Athletic Association (NCAA) Division I national champion for the 2019-20 season. It was scheduled to run from Wednesday, March 18th, 2020 through Saturday, March 21st, 2020 at the Gabrielsen Natatorium in Athens, Georgia. The host team was the Georgia Bulldogs of the University of Georgia.

On March 12, 2020, the tournament, as well as all other NCAA championships for the remainder of the academic season, were canceled due to the COVID-19 pandemic in the United States.

See also
List of college swimming and diving teams

References

NCAA Division I Women's Swimming and Diving Championships
NCAA Division I Swimming And Diving Championships